This is a list of 5α-reductase inhibitors (5α-RIs), drugs which inhibit one or more isoforms of the enzyme 5α-reductase. This enzyme is responsible for the conversion of the androgen hormone testosterone into the more potent dihydrotestosterone (DHT) and is essential for the production of neurosteroids like allopregnanolone, tetrahydrodeoxycorticosterone (THDOC), and 3α-androstanediol from progesterone, deoxycorticosterone, and DHT, respectively. 5α-Reductase inhibitors have medical applications in the treatment of benign prostatic hyperplasia, androgenic alopecia (pattern hair loss), and hirsutism (excessive hair growth).

Pharmaceutical drugs
5α-RIs that are used in medicine include the following:

 Alfatradiol (Ell-Cranell Alpha, Pantostin)
 Dutasteride (Avodart) – inhibits types 1, 2, and 3
 Epristeride (Aipuliete, Chuanliu) – inhibits type 2
 Finasteride (Proscar, Propecia) – inhibits types 2 and 3

Experimental drugs
5α-RIs that were under development for potential clinical use but were never marketed or are used in research include the following:

 4-MA – inhibits types 1 and 2 ( = 8.5 nM), but also  inhibitor, investigated extensively but found to be hepatotoxic
 17β-Carboxy-4-androsten-3-one
 AS-97004
 Azelaic Acid
 Bexlosteride (LY-300502) – inhibits type 1
 CGP-53153
 Efomycin G (SNA 4606-2)
 EM-402
 FCE-28260 – inhibits types 1 and 2
 FK-143
 FR-146687
 G-20000
 Izonsteride (LY-320236) – inhibits types 1 and 2
 L-10
 L-39
 L-697818
 L-751788 (16-((4-chlorophenyl)oxy)-4,7-dimethyl-4-azaandronstan-3-one)
 Lapisteride (CS-891) – inhibits types 1 and 2
 LY-191704
 LY-266111
 MK-386 (L-733692) – inhibits type 1
 MK-434 – inhibits type 2
 MK-963 (L-654066) – inhibits type 2
 ONO-3805 (ONO-RI-3805)
 PHL-00801 (Prostatonin; PY 102/UR 102; Pygeum africanum/Urtica dioica extract)
 PNU-157706 – inhibits types 1 and 2
 Steroidal oximes
 Turosteride (FCE-26073) – inhibits type 2 and to a 15-fold lesser extent type 1
 Z-350 – also an α1-adrenergic receptor antagonist

Herbs and other inhibitors

Many plants, as well as their associated phytochemical constituents, have inhibitory effects on 5α-reductase. In addition, many of these compounds are also phytoestrogens. Examples include the following:

 Lion's Mane mushrooms 
 Alizarin,.
 Angelica koreana 
 Astaxanthin
 Azelaic acid, (sometimes combined with minoxidil hair solution).
 Black Pepper leaf extract (Piper nigrum) 
 β-Sitosterol, one of many phytosterols.
 Chinese knotweed (Reynoutria multiflora, syn. Polygonum multiflorum), contains resveratrol-like Stilbenoids.
 Curcumin, the principal curcuminoid of turmeric.
 Dodder (Cuscuta reflexa)
 Eastern arborvitae, northern whitecedar (Thuja occidentalis)
 Euphorbia jolkinii
 Fatty acids: The relative inhibitory potencies of unsaturated fatty acids are, in decreasing order: Gamma-Linolenic acid, alpha-linolenic acid, linoleic acid, palmitoleic acid, oleic acid, and myristoleic acid.
 Medium chain fatty acids such as those found in coconut and the kernel of many palm fruits have also been found to inhibit 5α-reductase.
 Garden balsam or rose balsam (Impatiens balsamina)
 Green tea catechins, including (-)-epicatechin-3-gallate, and (-)-epigallo-catechin-3-gallate (EGCG). However, another research found that green tea may actually increase DHT levels.
Black tea theaflavins 
 Japanese hedge parsley (Torilis japonica)
 Ku Shen or Bitter root (Sophora flavescens)
 Lingzhi mushroom or Reishi mushroom (Ganoderma lucidum)
 Ganoderic acid, or Ganoderol B are thought to be the compounds in the mushroom that are specifically active.
 Pesticides: Certain pesticides are able to disturb the sex steroid hormone system and to act as antiandrogens.
Phyllanthus emblica
 Pine (Pinus sp. resin, active substance abietic acid)
 Pollen of Turnip, turnip rape, fast plants, field mustard, or turnip mustard (Brassica rapa)
 Polyphenols
 Red stinkwood (Pygeum africanum)
 Riboflavin (vitamin B2). 
 Saw palmetto (Serenoa repens, active substance possibly lauric acid)
 The berries of saw palmetto, a small palm native to the south east United States, possess a dual but weak 5a-reductase inhibition activity, due to their high content of phytosterols: β-sitosterol, stigmasterol, lupeol, lupenone, and cycloartenol. The lipido-sterol extract markedly inhibits both the human isoenzymes. Type 1 isoenzyme is noncompetitively (Ki = 7.2 μg/mL) and type 2 isoenzyme uncompetitively (Ki = 4.9 μg/mL) inhibited. In vitro studies revealed a 5a-reductase inhibition activity of 1:5600 compared to finasteride but is at minimum 1:18000 in vivo. Meaning the 5a-reductase inhibition activity of 1mg finasteride is equal to 18000mg saw palmetto. 
 Spore of Japanese climbing fern (Lygodium japonicum)
 Valoneic acid dilactone and gallagyldilactone are two hydrolysable tannin polyphenols isolated from the heartwood of Shorea laevifolia and the North American white oak (Quercus alba) and European red oak (Quercus robur) and are inhibitory.
 Zinc.

These supplements have limited testing in human clinical trials, and their potential for the treatment of BPH, androgenic alopecia, and related conditions is unknown.

References 

5α-Reductase inhibitors